Longpo Naval Base is a naval base for nuclear submarines along the southern coast of Hainan Island, China. This underground base has been reported by several intelligence agencies, especially Indian agencies. The images collected by the Federation of American Scientists (FAS) in February 2008 shows that China constructed a large scale underground base for its naval forces. In August 2020, satellite imagery from Planet Labs appeared to show a Shang-class submarine entering the underground base.

Description
The caverns are capable of hiding up to 20 nuclear submarines based on reconnaissance satellites data collected. The harbor houses nuclear ballistic missile submarines and is large enough to accommodate  aircraft carriers. The US Department of Defense estimated that China would have five Type 094 nuclear submarines operational by 2010 with each capable of carrying 12 JL-2 intercontinental ballistic missiles. Two 950 metre piers and three smaller ones would be enough to accommodate two carrier strike groups or amphibious assault ships.

Location
The submarine base is located at the point in Chinese territory that is closest to the continental shelf. Speculation has been raised that the base is intended to be expanded to include future capability for aircraft carrier groups.

The submarine base is only a few miles from the city of Sanya, a popular tourist destination and the site of a major planned cruise hub. The base is immediately next to the Yalong Bay National Resort District featuring many resort hotels.

Strategic importance
More than half of the world's annual merchant fleet tonnage passes through the Strait of Malacca, Sunda Strait, and Lombok Strait, with the majority continuing on into the South China Sea. Tanker traffic through the Strait of Malacca leading into the South China Sea is more than three times greater than Suez Canal traffic, and well over five times more than the Panama Canal. The People's Republic of China (PRC) has stated its claim to almost the entire body of water and is currently building multiple bases in the South China Sea to control them.

See also 
 Jianggezhuang Naval Base, nuclear submarine base in Qingdao
 Yulin Naval Base, traditional base in Sanya

References

External links
 

Buildings and structures in Hainan
People's Liberation Army Navy submarine bases
Military installations established in 1955
South Sea Fleet
Sanya